John Seden (1840–1921) was a hybridist and horticulturist best known for the hybrids he created while in the employment of Veitch Nurseries. He was trained in hybridizing by John Dominy in 1861. In 1873 he began hybridizing tuberous begonias which in turn formed the basis from which modern garden begonias are derived.

References
Robert Olby (2000). "Mendelism: from hybrids and trade to a science", Comptes Rendus de l’Académie des Sciences - Series III - Sciences de la Vie, Volume 323, Issue 12, Pages 1043-1051.
Shirley Heriz-Smith (1989). "James Veitch & Sons of Exeter and Chelsea", Garden History, Vol. 17, No. 2, pp. 135–153

External links
List of Plants Raised by John Seden

1840 births
1921 deaths
People from Dedham, Essex
English horticulturists
Veitch Nurseries
Victoria Medal of Honour recipients